Williamstown is an unincorporated community and census-designated place (CDP) located in Monroe Township in Gloucester County, New Jersey. As of the 2010 U.S. census, Williamstown's population was 15,567.

History
Before the community's settlement in 1737, Williamstown was inhabited by the Lenni-Lenape tribe of Native Americans, from whom the town derived its original name, "Squankum." It is generally thought that 'evil spirits' referred to the abundance of mosquitoes in the area, a by-product of the low-lying swamps that characterized the area during that time period. In the early eighteenth century, Richard Penn sold what eventually became Williamstown to his grandson, John Williams, who divided and resold the land in lots to settlers and for whom the town was eventually renamed. The town was officially incorporated as Monroe Township in March 1859, with Williamstown as meeting place to vote and have town discussions. A municipal court was established in the Township of Monroe, in accordance with the provisions of Chapter 264 of the Laws of 1948. The first school was built in 1750 and stood where the Washington Hotel now stands. The local schools operated on a pay-as-you-go basis until the 1850s and were predominantly church-run. The area built its first high school in 1958.

The population of the town remained small until the early 1830s when the glass industry sprung up (Glassboro, a neighboring town, still bears the name borne of that commercial boom). The first company to form was called Free Will Glass Manufacturing and caused a population surge. The industry thrived until the early 1900s when agricultural businesses began to flourish in the face of the waning glass industry. One notable company, The John Sharp Canning Co., still operates today as Blue Ribbon. The Monroe Township Historical Society was formed as a volunteer organization on October 16, 1974, by Mayor John W. Sharp (of the Canning Company Sharps), dedicated to the preservation of items that reflect the history of Monroe Township.

In 2014, the community had a death rate from heroin that was 25 times the national average, with about five people per year dying of overdoses and other complications in the previous decade.

Geography
According to the U.S. Census Bureau, Williamstown had a total area of 7.423 square miles (19.225 km2), including 7.419 square miles (19.216 km2) of land and 0.004 square miles (0.010 km2) of water (0.05%). It has a humid subtropical climate (Cfa) and average monthly temperatures range from 33.2° in January to 76.7 °F in July. The hardiness zone is 7a.

Demographics

2010 Census

2000 Census
As of the 2000 U.S. census, there were 11,812 people, 4,484 households, and 3,223 families residing in the CDP. The population density was 740.4/km2 (1,916.7/mi2). There were 4,764 housing units at an average density of 298.6/km2 (773.1/mi2). The racial makeup of the CDP was 85.68% White, 10.35% African American, 0.30% Native American, 0.96% Asian, 0.06% Pacific Islander, 0.99% from other races, and 1.67% from two or more races. Hispanic or Latino of any race were 2.87% of the population.

There were 4,484 households, out of which 32.6% had children under the age of 18 living with them, 55.6% were married couples living together, 12.2% had a female householder with no husband present, and 28.1% were non-families. 23.8% of all households were made up of individuals, and 11.6% had someone living alone who was 65 years of age or older. The average household size was 2.63 and the average family size was 3.13.

In the CDP, the population was spread out, with 25.2% under the age of 18, 8.0% from 18 to 24, 29.0% from 25 to 44, 23.0% from 45 to 64, and 14.9% who were 65 years of age or older. The median age was 37 years. For every 100 females, there were 90.5 males. For every 100 females age 18 and over, there were 85.4 males.

The median income for a household in the CDP was $44,200, and the median income for a family was $51,552. Males had a median income of $40,411 versus $29,112 for females. The per capita income for the CDP was $19,112. About 5.5% of families and 7.5% of the population were below the poverty line, including 10.8% of those under age 18 and 4.7% of those age 65 or over.

Transportation
U.S. Route 322 and New Jersey Route 42 pass through Central Williamstown.

Education
Monroe Township Public Schools is a comprehensive public school district serving the educational needs of resident students from grades Kindergarten through twelve.

St. Mary School is a K-8 elementary school that operates under the auspices of the Roman Catholic Diocese of Camden.

Recreation
Scotland Run Golf Club is a public golf course located in Williamstown, near U.S. Route 322.

Tall Pines Day Camp is a summer camp in Williamstown, for young children and teenagers. It was founded in 1996 and is accredited by the American Camping Association.

Operating since 1961 and located within five minutes from the center of Williamstown, Hospitality Creek is a campground consisting of an RV park, Olympic-size swimming pool,  lake, and other outdoor amenities.

Skydive Cross Keys, operating out of Cross Keys Airport, offers both tandem skydiving and skydive training.

Notable people

People who were born in, residents of, or otherwise closely associated with Williamstown include:
 Dave Calloway (born 1968), college basketball coach and the former head men's basketball coach at Monmouth University.
 Brittany Ratcliffe (born 1994), soccer player who plays as a forward for North Carolina Courage in the NWSL.

References

External links

History of Monroe Township
Hospitality Creek Campground

1737 establishments in New Jersey
Census-designated places in Gloucester County, New Jersey
Monroe Township, Gloucester County, New Jersey
Populated places established in 1737